Napier Healthcare is a healthcare information technology company, established in 1996, that offers healthcare software for private and government hospitals, clinics, pharmacies and diagnostic centers.

Napier is headquartered in Singapore with its global development center in Hyderabad and business operations in Mumbai, Delhi,  and Bangalore in India. Napier's presence is extended to Turkey, Saudi Arabia, Dubai, China, South Africa, Kenya, Tanzania, Bhutan and Malaysia.

History 

Napier Healthcare was formed in 1996 as "Karishma Software". On 17 September 2010, the company was renamed "Napier Healthcare". Napier provides information technology solutions in healthcare. In November 2012, the company appointed Karthik Tirupathi, an IT industry veteran, as CEO to lead its geographic expansion and growth efforts.

Partners 

Napier Healthcare works with IT companies such as IBM, INTEL, HP, Microsoft, Oracle and a few others.

Products & services 

 Napier Hospital Information System (HIS)
 Napier Intermediate & Long-term Care (iLTC)
 Napier Remote Patient Monitoring (RPM) Solution
 Care Mobility
 Regulatory Medical Systems
 Napier Assistant
 Interactive EMR
 Patient Portal
 MyNapier

References

External links 
 Vaatsalya Raises $10M From Aquarius India, Seedfund
 Napier Profile on Businessweek

Health information technology companies